Clonmany railway station served Clonmany in County Donegal, Ireland.

The station opened on 1 July 1901 on the Londonderry and Lough Swilly Railway line from Londonderry Graving Dock to Carndonagh.

It closed for passengers on 2 December 1935.

History 

The station played an important role in transporting troops to several British Army bases that were situated in the vicinity of Clonmany.  During the first world war, the Glenfield Training Camp was opened in Straid, just outside the village.  Leenan and Dunree Forts were also nearby. During the War of Independence, in July 1921, railway workers refused to transport British Soldiers. The soldiers were removed from the train and sent back to Leenan fort.

A man from Rooskey - Hugh O'Donnell - was convicted in January 1925 of stealing 9 stone of coal from the railway company. In his defence, O'Donnell said that he thought that the coal belonged to the British Military, who at the time, still occupied two forts nearby. O'Donnell was found guilty and sentenced to one month's hard labour.

In January 1935, a man from the Isle of Doagh  - William McLaughlin - was arrested at the railway station when he was found in possession of 3 1/2 pounds of yeast.  At the time, illicit brewing of alcohol was a significant element of the local economy. In order to possess large quantities of yeast, one was required to have a permit. Otherwise, the presumption was that if an individual had a large amount of yeast then it was being used for the production of Poteen. McLaughlin was convicted and fined £20.

Accidents 
On 20 July 1903 Michael Quigley, a porter at Clonmany station, broke his shin after his foot was caught between the platform and a train carriage footboard. Quigley sued the Londonderry and Lough Swilley Railway company for damages. In January 1904 he was awarded £70 damages with costs by the Lifford Quarter Sessions.

In  August 1909, a carriage of train from Clonmany to Buncrana caught fire.  The train was chartered for passengers returning from the Clonmany horse races. On arrival at Buncrana, passengers reported that the bottom of a carriage was burning freely.   The train was quickly evacuated and moved to a siding and the fire was put out.

In February 1928, a bull escaped after being loaded onto a wagon, where it was due to be transported from Clonmany to the Carndonagh fair.  The animal ran along the platform, frightening passengers waiting to get on the train. It then ran along the railway track and escaped onto the main street running through the village, causing panic among school children. Despite efforts of the police and locals, the animal escaped deep into the countryside.

On 30 August 1928 a train carriage jumped the rails while it was being shunted through the station. The carriage was full of passengers who had just attended the Clonmany races. Although no-one was injured, the carriages were evacuated.

In July 1933, a horse bolted as it was being used to load timber onto a railway carriage, causing planks to be scattered in all directions. The horse galloped into the village and was eventually caught by a local policeman.

Architecture 
After the line was closed, the station building was converted into a house. In 2008, it was listed in the national inventory of architectural heritage.  Remnants of the platform and the water tower are still visible.

Routes

References

Disused railway stations in County Donegal
Railway stations opened in 1901
Railway stations closed in 1935
1901 establishments in Ireland
1935 disestablishments in Ireland
Railway stations in the Republic of Ireland opened in the 20th century